Gorenjski Vrh is a settlement in the Municipality of Zavrč in the Haloze area of eastern Slovenia. The area traditionally belonged to the Styria region. It is now included in the Drava Statistical Region.

The local church is dedicated to John the Baptist and belongs to the Parish of Zavrč. It dates to the second half of the 17th century.

References

External links
Gorenjski Vrh on Geopedia

Populated places in the Municipality of Zavrč